Winthrop is a town in Okanogan County, Washington, United States. It is east of Mazama and north of Twisp. The population was 349 at the 2000 census, and it increased to 394 at the 2010 census.

History

Winthrop was incorporated on March 12, 1924. Native Americans were the first inhabitants of Winthrop. They lived along the banks of the Methow, Twisp, and Chewuch rivers, digging camas root, picking berries, fishing and hunting. Fur trappers visited the valley in the 19th century.

In the spring of 1868, placer gold was discovered in the Slate Creek District.

In 1883, the lure of gold brought the first permanent settlers, three of whom were James Ramsey, Ben Pearrygin, and Guy Waring. Waring stopped at the forks of the Chewuch and Methow rivers in 1891. His family settled into the "Castle" (now the Shafer Museum). Although Waring is the acclaimed founding father, the town is named after Theodore Winthrop, a Yale graduate, adventurer/traveler and gifted 19th century author. The town was rebuilt after a devastating fire in 1893. Waring's original Duck Brand Saloon was built in 1891. It survived the fire and is now Winthrop's Town Hall.

In 1894, a flood carried away the bridge at the north fork of the river at Winthrop. Colonel Tom Hart rebuilt the bridge in 1895 at Slate Creek. The industry of Winthrop at this time consisted of a well-equipped saw mill, several important dairies, raising cattle, and supplying the local mines with goods.

Owen Wister, Waring's Harvard roommate, wrote The Virginian, America's first western novel, after honeymooning in Winthrop.
By 1915, most of the mines, except for a few in the Slate Creek area, had shut down.

In 1972, when State Highway 20 was nearing completion over the North Cascades, several business people began planning for travelers passing through the town. They agreed to the idea of a western-themed restoration which still exists.

In 2012, Winthrop was ranked #2 in a National Motorists Association listing of its "Worst Speed Trap Cities" in North America (qualification of a population less than 50,000).

Local residents call themselves Winthroppers, a town song was even written in the 90's called "I'm A Winthropper" to the tune of "I'm A Girl Watcher".

Local attractions

Winthrop is known for the American Old West design of all the buildings in town, making it a tourist destination. The town theme idea was inspired by the example of Leavenworth, Washington, which in turn was heavily based on Solvang, California. Winthrop is a popular cross-country skiing site, with over 120 miles (200K) of groomed trails., Other popular activities include rock climbing, hiking, mountain biking, river rafting, horse-back riding, hunting and fishing, golfing,  spectacular sight-seeing and other outdoor activities. Events include the Winthrop Rhythm and Blues Festival, the Methow Valley Chamber Music Festival, live theatre and many art galleries.

Winthrop is home to the oldest legal saloon in Washington state.

The North Cascades National Park borders to the west.

A smokejumper base is also nearby, located between Winthrop and the nearby town of Twisp.

Geography and climate
Winthrop has a lake, called Pearrygin Lake, that is a popular swimming hole as well. Like most of the Inland Northwest, Winthrop experiences a humid continental climate (Köppen Dsb), with cold, snowy winters and very warm summers with cool nights and little rainfall.

Demographics

As of the census of 2010, there were 394 people, 205 households, and 109 families residing in the town. The racial makeup of the town was 97.5% White, 0.5% African American, 0.3% Asian, 0.8% from other races, and 1.0% from two or more races. Hispanic or Latino of any race were 4.3% of the population.

There were 205 households, of which 22.0% had children under the age of 18 living with them, 40.0% were married couples living together, 9.8% had a female householder with no husband present, 3.4% had a male householder with no wife present, and 46.8% were non-families. 43.4% of all households were made up of individuals, and 16.6% had someone living alone who was 65 years of age or older. The average household size was 1.92 and the average family size was 2.59.

The median age in the town was 47.9 years. 17.8% of residents were under the age of 18; 6.1% were between the ages of 18 and 24; 21.8% were from 25 to 44; 35.4% were from 45 to 64; and 19% were 65 years of age or older. The gender makeup of the town was 49.0% male and 51.0% female.

References

External links

 Winthrop Chamber Website

Towns in Okanogan County, Washington
Towns in Washington (state)
Populated places in the Okanagan Country